George Menachery is a professor, anthropologist, indologist, and historian of Syro-Malabar Church and of Kerala. He is the editor of the St. Thomas Christian Encyclopedia of India and the Indian Church History Classics.On 27 Oct. '22 he was bestowed with an honoris cusa degree of Ph.D. in Theology by SHUATS, Prayagraj-Alahabad. His latest book "Ecumenism and Church Unity in India" was released on 7th Sept. '22 at Karlsruhe, Germany during the 11th Assembly of the WCC. Menachery is also the recipient of the Chevalier honour of the Order of Saint Gregory the Great

Major works
Menachery has published books and articles in addition to scripting, researching, or directing television documentaries/serials and delivering many radio talks. His works include:
1973: The St. Thomas Christian Encyclopaedia of India; vol. I (editor)
1982: The St. Thomas Christian Encyclopaedia of India; vol. II (editor) 
1984: Pallikkalakalum Mattum (Malayalam)
1986: Pope John Paul II Indian Visit Souvenir, Trichur 
1987: Trichur Archdiocesan Centenary Volume (member of the editorial board)
1996: The St. Antony Octingenary Volume, (chief ed.) Ollur
1998: The Indian Church History Classics; Vol. I: The Nazranies
2000: Thomapedia
2005: Glimpses of Nazraney Heritage
2004: Christian Contribution to Nation Building: a Third Millennium Enquiry (ed. with Ponnumuthan and Aerath) Documentary Committee of CBCI-KCBC National Celebration of the Jubilee of St. Thomas and St. Francis Xavier, 2004
2006: The Indian Christian Directory ICD - Deepika Kottayam (ed. in charge)
2009: The St. Thomas Christian Encyclopaedia of India; vol. III (editor)
2011: India's Christian Heritage (ed. with Snaitang) Church History Association of India (2011, 2012);
2013: Catholic Directory of India, CBCI, New Delhi (member of the editorial board)
2014: Aanayum Nazraaniyum [The Elephant and the Thomas Christian] (Malayalam) 
2015: Pallikalile Chitrabhaasangal [The Murals of Kerala Churches] (Malayalam) 
2016: Dasaavatharika [Menachery's Introductions to ten books by reputed authors dealing with history, culture] (Malayalam) 
2018: Facets of India's Christian Legacy [Menachery's ten famous articles/papers dealing with history, culture, archaeology, art, architecture]

References

Syro-Malabar Catholics
20th-century Indian historians
20th-century Indian archaeologists
Living people
Knights of St. Gregory the Great
People from Thrissur district
St. Thomas College, Thrissur alumni
1938 births
Malayali people
Scientists from Kerala
Malayalam-language writers
Writers from Kerala
Indian Christian writers